The Edinburgh Ladies' Emancipation Society was a leading abolitionist group based in Edinburgh, Scotland, in the nineteenth century. The women associated with the organisation are considered "heroines" and the impact of these abolitionist organisations for women are thought to have had a notional impact.

History
The Edinburgh Ladies' Emancipation Society was a later addition to societies formed in 1833; on 7 October 1833, a group of activists formed the Edinburgh Emancipation Society, the Glasgow Emancipation Society, and the Glasgow Ladies's Emancipation Society. The Edinburgh societies were formed to support George Thompson, as he had received an invitation to visit the New England Emancipation Society which was led by the 28-year-old William Lloyd Garrison. Dr. John Ritchie was in the chair and among the three secretaries was Robert Kaye Greville.

The emancipation societies would host abolitionist speakers on lecture tours of Great Britain, although the Edinburgh Ladies' society eventually rejected speakers from the British and Foreign Anti-Slavery Society. This was because the British and the American abolitionist movements were split over the beliefs of Garrison, who advocated the immediate release of American slaves. Edinburgh, like Glasgow, Dublin, Bristol, and Clifton, were strong supporters of Garrison's proposal, whilst other groups favoured a managed move away from slavery. John Wigham of the Edinburgh Emancipation Society had set up links with the British and Foreign Anti-Slavery Society (BFASS), and it was his wife Jane Wigham and his daughter Eliza Wigham who steered the Ladies' Emancipation Society to different loyalties.

Eliza Wigham, as secretary of the society, corresponded with many of the leading abolitionists. She was friends with anti-slavery activists like Wendell Phillips, George Thompson. and Frederick Douglass. An American ex-slave, Douglass visited Edinburgh and accompanied members of the society when in the 1840s they wrote "Send Back the Money" on the grass of Salisbury Crags in Edinburgh. The graffiti was aimed at the Free Church of Scotland, which had accepted funding from American slave-owning organisations.

The society moved away from its support of Garrison, and Eliza and Jane Wigham were encouraged to leave in protest, but they remained as members. The society tried to steer a compromise position between the radical Garrison and the more conservative position of the BFASS. The Wighams supported Mary Estlin's initiative to find common ground between the Garrisonians and the BFASS.

Eliza also corresponded with Levi Coffin and Thomas Garrett of the Underground Railroad. She sent Garrett money towards the cost of supporting the slaves who were smuggling themselves to Canada via Garrett's house.

Unlike other anti-slavery organisations that splintered, the Edinburgh organisation was still running in 1870. Credit for this was given to Jane and Eliza Wigham.

Legacy
Four of the women associated with the organisation were the subject of a campaign by Edinburgh historians in 2015. The group intended to gain recognition for Elizabeth Pease Nichol, Priscilla Bright McLaren, Eliza Wigham, and Jane Wigham – the city's "forgotten heroines".

References

Organisations based in Edinburgh
Abolitionist organizations
Slavery in the British Empire
1830s establishments in Scotland
1870s disestablishments in Scotland
Defunct organisations based in Scotland
Women in Scotland
Political movements in Scotland